Arne Carl-August Beurling (3 February 1905 – 20 November 1986) was a Swedish mathematician and professor of mathematics at Uppsala University (1937–1954) and later at the Institute for Advanced Study in Princeton, New Jersey. Beurling worked extensively in harmonic analysis, complex analysis and potential theory.  The "Beurling factorization" helped mathematical scientists to understand the Wold decomposition, and inspired further work on the invariant subspaces of linear operators and operator algebras, e.g. Håkan Hedenmalm's factorization theorem for Bergman spaces.

He is perhaps most famous for single-handedly decrypting an early version of the German cipher machine Siemens and Halske T52 in a matter of two weeks during 1940, using only pen and paper. This machine's cipher is generally considered to be more complicated than that of the more famous Enigma machine.

Early life
Beurling was born on 3 February 1905 in Gothenburg, Sweden and was the son of the landowner Konrad Beurling and baroness Elsa Raab. After graduating in 1924, he was enrolled at the Uppsala University where he received a Bachelor of Arts degree in 1926 and two years later a Licentiate of Philosophy degree.

Career

Early career
Beurling was assistant teacher at Uppsala University from 1931 to 1933. He received his doctorate in mathematics in 1933 for his dissertation Études sur un problème de majoration. Beurling was a docent of mathematics at Uppsala University from 1933 and then professor of mathematics from 1937 to 1954.

World War II
In the summer of 1940 he single-handedly deciphered and reverse-engineered an early version of the Siemens and Halske T52 also known as the Geheimfernschreiber ("secret teletypewriter") used by Nazi Germany in World War II for sending ciphered messages. The T52 was one of the so-called "Fish cyphers", that, using transposition, created nearly one quintillion (893,622,318,929,520,960) different variations. It took Beurling two weeks to solve the problem using pen and paper. Using Beurling's work, a device was created that enabled Sweden to decipher German teleprinter traffic passing through Sweden from Norway on a cable. In this way, Swedish authorities knew about Operation Barbarossa before it occurred. Since the Swedes would not reveal how this knowledge was attained, the Swedish warning was not treated as credible by Soviets.

This became the foundation for the Swedish National Defence Radio Establishment (FRA). The cypher in the Geheimfernschreiber is generally considered to be more complex than the cypher used in the Enigma machines.

Later life
He was visiting professor at Harvard University from 1948 to 1949. From 1954 he was professor at the Institute for Advanced Study in Princeton, New Jersey, United States, where he took over Albert Einstein's office.

He was the doctoral advisor of Lennart Carleson and Carl-Gustav Esseen.

Personal life

Arne Beurling was first married (1936–40) to Britta Östberg (born 1907), daughter of Henrik Östberg and Gerda Nilsson. In 1950 he married Karin Lindblad (1920–2006), daughter of ironmonger Henric Lindblad and Wanja Bengtsson. Karin was a distinguished Ph.D student from Uppsala University. When they lived in Princeton, she worked in a biochemistry lab at Princeton University. He had two children from his first marriage — Pehr-Henrik (1936-62) and Jane (1938-92).

Beurling's great-grandfather was Pehr Henrik Beurling (1758 or 1763–1806), who founded a high quality clock factory in Stockholm in 1783.

Death
Arne Beurling died in 1986 and was buried at Norra begravningsplatsen in Solna.

In popular culture
Beurling's prowess as a cryptanalysist is the subject of the 2005 short opera Krypto CEG by Jonas Sjöstrand and Kimmo Eriksson.

Awards and decorations
Knight of the Order of the Polar Star
Knight of the Order of Vasa

Honours
Honorary member of the Göteborgs nation at Uppsala University (1937)
Member of the Royal Swedish Academy of Sciences (1937)
Member of the Royal Society of the Humanities at Lund (Kungliga Humanistiska Vetenskapssamfundet i Lund) (1937)
Member of the Finnish Society of Sciences and Letters (1942)
Member of the Royal Physiographic Society in Lund (1948)
Member of the Royal Danish Academy of Sciences and Letters (1951)
Fellow of the American Academy of Arts and Sciences (1970)

See also
Beurling zeta function
Beurling transform

References

External links
Arne Beurling and the success of Swedish Signal Intelligence

1905 births
1986 deaths
Pre-computer cryptographers
20th-century Swedish mathematicians
Uppsala University alumni
Institute for Advanced Study faculty
Members of the Royal Swedish Academy of Sciences
Members of the Royal Physiographic Society in Lund
Members of the Royal Danish Academy of Sciences and Letters
Fellows of the American Academy of Arts and Sciences
Scientists from Gothenburg
Knights of the Order of the Polar Star
Knights of the Order of Vasa
Burials at Norra begravningsplatsen
Swedish cryptographers
Members of the Royal Society of Sciences in Uppsala